Tongji Nanlu Station is a Subway station on the Yizhuang Line of the Beijing Subway. It opened on December 30, 2010, together with the other stations on the line.

Station Layout 
The station has an elevated island and side platform.

Exits 
The station has 2 exits, lettered A1 and B1. Exit A1 is accessible.

References

External links

Beijing Subway stations in Tongzhou District
Railway stations in China opened in 2010